was a  after the Taika era and before Shuchō. This period spanned the years from February 650 through December 654.

History
The daimyō of Nagato Province brought a white pheasant to the court as a gift for the emperor. This white pheasant was then construed as a good omen. Emperor Kōtoku was extraordinarily pleased by this special avian rarity, and he wanted the entire court to see this white bird for themselves. He commanded a special audience in which he could formally invite the sadaijin and the udaijin to join him in admiring the rare bird; and on this occasion, the emperor caused the nengō to be changed to Hakuchi (meaning "white pheasant").

In Japan, this was the second nengō, derived from the Chinese system of eras (nianhao); although some scholarly doubt has been cast on the authenticity of Taika and Hakuchi as historically legitimate era names.<ref>Bialock, David T. (2007). {{Google books|kfWvoVERWREC|Eccentric Spaces, Hidden Histories: Narrative, Ritual, and Royal Authority from the Chronicles of Japan to the Tale of the Heike, pp. 56–57|page=56}}; excerpt at p. 57, "Whether the era name of Taika and Hakuchi are viewed as evidence of an actual precedent set by Kōtoku or as the work of chroniclers belonging to a later reign around the time of Nihon Shokis editing, the practice of assigning era names inaugurated a new phase in the consolidation of the court's expanding political power."</ref>

Timeline

The system of Japanese era names was not the same as Imperial reign dates.

Events of the Hakuchi era
 650 (Hakuchi 1):  Kōtoku commanded that all prisoners were to be granted liberty throughout the country.
 654 (Hakuchi 5, 1st month): A great number of rats moved into the province of  Yamato; and this was construed as a sign that the capital should be moved.
 654 (Hakuchi 5): Kōtoku died at the age of 59 after a reign of 10 years—five years during Taika, and five years during Hakuchi.

Notes

References
 Bialock, David T. (2007). Eccentric Spaces, Hidden Histories: Narrative, Ritual, and Royal Authority from the Chronicles of Japan to the Tale of the Heike. Stanford: Stanford University Press.  ;  OCLC 237216457
 Brown, Delmer M. and Ichirō Ishida, eds. (1979).  Gukanshō: The Future and the Past. Berkeley: University of California Press. ;  OCLC 251325323
 Nussbaum, Louis-Frédéric and Käthe Roth. (2005).  Japan encyclopedia. Cambridge: Harvard University Press. ;  OCLC 58053128
 Titsingh, Isaac. (1834). Nihon Odai Ichiran; ou,  Annales des empereurs du Japon.  Paris: Royal Asiatic Society, Oriental Translation Fund of Great Britain and Ireland. OCLC 5850691
 Varley, H. Paul. (1980). A Chronicle of Gods and Sovereigns: Jinnō Shōtōki of Kitabatake Chikafusa.'' New York: Columbia University Press.  ;  OCLC 6042764

External links
 National Diet Library, "The Japanese Calendar" -- historical overview plus illustrative images from library's collection

Japanese eras
650 beginnings
7th century in Japan
654 endings